John F. Driscoll (born in Sydney, New South Wales), nicknamed "Old Jack", was an Australian jockey who was best known for riding Tim Whiffler to victory in the 1867 Melbourne Cup.

References

Australian jockeys
Place of death missing
Year of birth missing
Year of death missing
Sportspeople from Sydney